Schönau is a city with approximately 4400 inhabitants in the district of Rhein-Neckar-Kreis, in Baden-Württemberg,  Germany. It is situated in the Odenwald hills, 10 km northeast of Heidelberg. Schönau Abbey is located here.

Geography 
Schönau lies on the southern slope of the Odenwald hills, in the valley of the River Steinach, a tributary of the Neckar River.

Neighbouring Communities 
The city is bordered to the north by Heiligkreuzsteinach, by Heddesbach to the northeast, by Hirschhorn to the east, Neckarsteinach and Neckargemünd to the south, and Wilhelmsfeld and Heidelberg to the west.

City structure 
The city Schönau belongs to the former municipality Altneudorf (German: combination of the words "old", "new" and "village"), which was created by the conglomeration of the villages Oberdorf and Unterdorf. On 8 May 1975 when municipal reform updated the city's zoning, Schönau's borders came to include Bei Altneudorf, Landheim Lessingschule (Lochmühle), Lindenbach and the houses of Hasselbacherhof. Additionally, the deserted village Bauerländerhof lies within its designated limits.

History

Schönau 
Schönau was first historically documented with the founding of the Schönau Abbey by the Prince-Bishopric of Worms in 1142. The monastery came under the patronage of the Electoral Palatinate in the 12th century and became a House monastery, abode and burial place of the Counts Palatine of the Rhine. In the Reformation, the Palatinate converted to Protestantism, until 1558 when Elector Palatine Otto Henry was succeeded by a secular caretaker and the monks were expelled. In 1562 with the arrival of 35 Calvinism refugee families from Wallonia, the dwelling rights were passed on to Die Evangelische Stiftung Pflege Schonau (German: The Evangelical Trust for the Care of Schönau) and the monastery grounds were converted to residential purposes. The immigrants brought their craft, mainly weaving and dyeing, into the rural environment.

Schönau was first designated a city in 1600. At the beginning of the 19th century, Schönau was part of Baden. In 1900, the city had approximately 2000 inhabitants. In 1935 Schönau's city designation was revoked, but reissued in 1956. After World War II the city took in 553 refugees, increasing the population to 3035 in 1947.

The ornithologist Christian Ludwig Brehm was born in Schönau in 1787.

Altneudorf 
The first mention of Altneudorf appears in 1316 as "Nuendorf". The settlement was created by the Strahlenberg dynasty from Waldeck in approximately the 13th century. From 1357 it was associated with their castle's domain, until 1803 when the settlement was allocated to Baden upon dissolution. Beginning in the 18th century, the name "Neudorf" came into usage in order to differentiate the area as a separate entity to Wilhelmsfeld. Although the region had its own district and assets, it belonged politically to Heiligkreuzsteinach until independence in 1844.

Incorporation 
The city in its present form was created as part of municipal reform in Baden-Württemberg through the unification of Schönau and Altneudorf on 9 May 1975.

References

Rhein-Neckar-Kreis